Sooner or Later is the debut studio album by English pop group BBMak, released on 16 May 2000 through Telstar and Hollywood Records. It was re-released in the United Kingdom the following year, peaking at number 16 in the UK charts. The album peaked at number 38 on the US Billboard 200, producing three hit singles, and was certified gold.

Track listing

Singles 
"Back Here" – UK CD 2 August 16, 1999; US April 11, 2000; UK CD 1 February 12, 2001 (TRL 06.16.00)
"Still On Your Side" – US July 17, 2001; UK May 14, 2001 (TRL 11.27.00)
"Ghost of You and Me" – (TRL Debut 05.11.01)

Track listing (Original Asia release) 
Released in Winter 1999. Victor Entertainment, Inc. Cat No. VICP-60913

"Back Here"
"Still on Your Side"
"Next Time"
"I Can Tell"
"Again"
"Can't Say"
"Miss You More"
"Emily's Song"
"September"
"Sooner or Later"
"More Than Words"

Charts

Weekly charts

Year-end charts

Certifications

Production (Asia Release) 
Track 1 – John Shanks, Oliver Leiber
Track 2 – Bob Thiele Jr., Dillon O'Brian
Track 3 – Oliver Leiber
Track 4 – Pro-Jay, Robin Thicke
Track 6 – Mark Jolley, Richard Cardwell, Milton McDonald
Track 11 – Darren Allison

References

External links 
Sooner Or Later (Asia) at Discogs

2000 debut albums
BBMak albums
Hollywood Records albums